Paul Garbani (born 21 June 1927) is a Swiss football manager.

References

1927 births
Living people
Swiss football managers
Étoile Carouge FC managers
Neuchâtel Xamax FCS managers
FC Lausanne-Sport managers
Urania Genève Sport managers